Sequoyah Country Club is an 18 hole, private equity, member-owned golf course and country club in Oakland, California. Founded in 1913, it hosted the Oakland Open from 1938 to 1944 – one of the premier professional golf tournaments on the Pacific coast, which featured prominently in the early golfing careers of Ben Hogan, Sam Snead, Byron Nelson, Jimmy Demaret, and others.

History 
On October 3, 1913, a group of 23 citizens, acting as initial underwriters, held their first meeting at the St. Francis Hotel in San Francisco, California and organized a new golf club.  They intentionally chose the traditional Indian spelling of 'Sequoyah' instead of the more commonly used version of the name 'Sequoia'.  The nine member board of directors consisted of: 

This board appointed committee leaders, including the membership committee, whose identity they kept secret. The golf club's bylaws allowed for 350 total members, of which 100 prospective members were already identified. Others who attended the founding meeting included: John C. Shipp, Frank H. Proctor, J.M. Stephens, J.H. Hunt, A.C. Baumbartner, Walter J. Wilson, M.H. Robbins Jr., K.B. Putnam, A.J. Coogan, W.A. Bissell, J.F. Neville, Fred Sherman, E.B. King, W.R. Thorsen, F.E. McGurrin, P.K. Gordon, and E.G. Garden.

Several of the early Sequoyah members were also members of Claremont Country Club.

Sequoyah is situated on a 180-acre parcel of land that encompasses a 6300-yard golf course with views as far north as Mt. Tamalpais, Golden Gate, and across the bay to Redwood City on the peninsula. The golf course is within an hour of San Francisco or Oakland downtown, and easily accessible by the Southern Pacific Railroad. The land is notable for its gently rolling terrain and soil conditions—sandy loam, with no trace of adobe clay.

Golf course 
At 6,100 yards, Sequoyah is short by modern standards, where courses are often 1,000 yards longer. However, it has small, challenging greens, and due to the course's hilly topology, lies are very often uneven.

The course record was established in 1955 by PGA professional Don Whitt, who was the club's first assistant golf professional before turning pro.

Unlike other local courses from its era, no public roads interrupt the layout. Sequoyah is completely fenced in and there are no homes that openly abut the golf course. It is not unusual to see wild turkey, deer, fox, vultures, eagles and falcons at Sequoyah.

Club house 
The club house was designed by architect Edward G. Garden, with all the amenities consistent with a modern country club for that era—including a main dining room, lunchroom grill, women's dressing room, men's locker room, main living room, sleeping accommodations for resident staff, open air swimming pool, tennis courts, twenty sleeping rooms for members, automobile parking, stables, and a golf pro shop. The original plan also reserved space for a polo field and race track.

Scorecard

Tournaments hosted 
 April 1916 Panama Pacific International Exposition (PPIE) Tournament Men's Professional Golf Event
 May 1916 Panama Pacific International Exposition (PPIE) Tournament Men's Open Championship played over 36 holes for medal play 
 August 2012 U.S. Mid-Amateur Qualifying
 July 2013 U.S. Women's Amateur Qualifying Tournament
 July 2014 U.S. Women's Amateur Qualifying Tournament
 June 2015 US Girls Junior Qualifying Results

Gallery

References 

Golf clubs and courses in California